The 1998 CFL season is considered to be the 45th season in modern-day Canadian football, although it is officially the 41st Canadian Football League season.

CFL News in 1998
The Canadian Football League signed a five-year television contract with TSN. With the deal, TSN had the right to all CFL television broadcasts. The league also made a sponsorship deal with Adidas, which made them the official footwear, practice wear, and sport glove provider of the CFL.

For only the second time in history, the city of Winnipeg hosted the Grey Cup game.

Regular season standings

Final regular season standings
Note: GP = Games Played, W = Wins, L = Losses, T = Ties, PF = Points For, PA = Points Against, Pts = Points

Bold text means that they have clinched the playoffs.
Calgary and Hamilton both have first round byes.

Grey Cup playoffs

The Calgary Stampeders are the 1998 Grey Cup Champions, defeating the Hamilton Tiger-Cats 26–24, at Winnipeg's Winnipeg Stadium on Mark McLoughlin's winning field goal.  The Stampeders have won their first championship since 1992. The Stampeders' Jeff Garcia (QB) was named the Grey Cup's Most Valuable Player and Vince Danielsen (SB) was the Grey Cup's Most Valuable Canadian.

Playoff bracket

CFL Leaders
 CFL Passing Leaders
 CFL Rushing Leaders
 CFL Receiving Leaders

1998 CFL All-Stars

Offence
QB – Jeff Garcia, Calgary Stampeders
RB – Kelvin Anderson, Calgary Stampeders
RB – Mike Pringle, Montreal Alouettes
SB – Derrell Mitchell, Toronto Argonauts
SB – Allen Pitts, Calgary Stampeders
WR – Donald Narcisse, Saskatchewan Roughriders
WR – Terry Vaughn, Calgary Stampeders
C – Carl Coulter, Hamilton Tiger-Cats
OG – Fred Childress, Calgary Stampeders
OG – Pierre Vercheval, Montreal Alouettes
OT – Uzooma Okeke, Montreal Alouettes
OT – Moe Elewonibi, BC Lions

Defence
DT – Joe Fleming, Winnipeg Blue Bombers
DT – Johnny Scott, BC Lions
DE – Elfrid Payton, Montreal Alouettes
DE – Joe Montford, Hamilton Tiger-Cats
LB – Calvin Tiggle, Hamilton Tiger-Cats
LB – Willie Pless, Edmonton Eskimos
LB – Alondra Johnson, Calgary Stampeders
CB – Eric Carter, Hamilton Tiger-Cats
CB – Steve Muhammad, BC Lions
DB – Gerald Vaughn, Hamilton Tiger-Cats
DB – Orlondo Steinauer, Hamilton Tiger-Cats
DS – Dale Joseph, BC Lions

Special teams
P – Tony Martino, Calgary Stampeders
K – Paul Osbaldiston, Hamilton Tiger-Cats
ST – Eric Blount, Winnipeg Blue Bombers

1998 Western All-Stars

Offence
QB – Jeff Garcia, Calgary Stampeders
RB – Kelvin Anderson, Calgary Stampeders
RB – Juan Johnson, BC Lions
SB – Vince Danielsen, Calgary Stampeders
SB – Allen Pitts, Calgary Stampeders
WR – Donald Narcisse, Saskatchewan Roughriders
WR – Terry Vaughn, Calgary Stampeders
C – Jamie Crysdale, Calgary Stampeders
OG – Fred Childress, Calgary Stampeders
OG – Bruce Beaton, Edmonton Eskimos
OT – John Terry, Saskatchewan Roughriders
OT – Moe Elewonibi, BC Lions

Defence
DT – Dave Chaytors, BC Lions
DT – Johnny Scott, BC Lions
DE – Leroy Blugh, Edmonton Eskimos
DE – Malvin Hunter, Edmonton Eskimos
LB – Darryl Hall, Calgary Stampeders
LB – Willie Pless, Edmonton Eskimos
LB – Alondra Johnson, Calgary Stampeders
CB – Marvin Coleman, Calgary Stampeders
CB – Steve Muhammad, BC Lions
DB – Glenn Rogers Jr., BC Lions
DB – Jack Kellogg, Calgary Stampeders
DS – Dale Joseph, BC Lions

Special teams
P – Tony Martino, Calgary Stampeders
K – Lui Passaglia, BC Lions
ST – Marvin Coleman, Calgary Stampeders

1998 Eastern All-Stars

Offence
QB – Kerwin Bell, Toronto Argonauts
RB – Ronald Williams, Hamilton Tiger-Cats
RB – Mike Pringle, Montreal Alouettes
SB – Derrell Mitchell, Toronto Argonauts
SB – Darren Flutie, Hamilton Tiger-Cats
WR – Paul Masotti, Toronto Argonauts
WR – Andrew Grigg, Hamilton Tiger-Cats
C – Carl Coulter, Hamilton Tiger-Cats
OG – Val St. Germain, Hamilton Tiger-Cats
OG – Pierre Vercheval, Montreal Alouettes
OT – Uzooma Okeke, Montreal Alouettes
OT – Chris Perez, Winnipeg Blue Bombers

Defence
DT – Joe Fleming, Winnipeg Blue Bombers
DT – Doug Petersen, Winnipeg Blue Bombers
DE – Elfrid Payton, Montreal Alouettes
DE – Joe Montford, Hamilton Tiger-Cats
LB – Calvin Tiggle, Hamilton Tiger-Cats
LB – Kelly Wiltshire, Toronto Argonauts
LB – Grant Carter, Winnipeg Blue Bombers
CB – Eric Carter, Hamilton Tiger-Cats
CB – Donald Smith, Toronto Argonauts
DB – Gerald Vaughn, Hamilton Tiger-Cats
DB – Orlondo Steinauer, Hamilton Tiger-Cats
DS – Lester Smith, Toronto Argonauts

Special teams
P – Noel Prefontaine, Toronto Argonauts
K – Paul Osbaldiston, Hamilton Tiger-Cats
ST – Eric Blount, Winnipeg Blue Bombers

1998 Intergold CFLPA All-Stars

Offence
QB – Jeff Garcia, Calgary Stampeders
OT – John Terry, Saskatchewan Roughriders
OT – Uzooma Okeke, Montreal Alouettes
OG – Fred Childress, Calgary Stampeders
OG – Jamie Taras, BC Lions
C – Jamie Crysdale, Calgary Stampeders
RB – Mike Pringle, Montreal Alouettes
FB – Michael Soles, Montreal Alouettes
SB – Derrell Mitchell, Toronto Argonauts
SB – Darren Flutie, Hamilton Tiger-Cats
WR – Donald Narcisse, Saskatchewan Roughriders
WR – Terry Vaughn, Calgary Stampeders

Defence
DE – Elfrid Payton, Montreal Alouettes
DE – Joe Montford, Hamilton Tiger-Cats
DT – Doug Petersen, Montreal Alouettes
DT – Joe Fleming, Winnipeg Blue Bombers
LB – Alondra Johnson, Calgary Stampeders
LB – Willie Pless, Edmonton Eskimos
LB – Calvin Tiggle, Hamilton Tiger-Cats
CB – Donald Smith, Toronto Argonauts
CB – Marvin Coleman, Calgary Stampeders
HB – Gerald Vaughn, Hamilton Tiger-Cats
HB – Kelly Wiltshire, Toronto Argonauts
S – Maurice Kelly, Winnipeg Blue Bombers

Special teams
K – Sean Fleming, Edmonton Eskimos
P – Tony Martino, Calgary Stampeders
ST – Eric Blount, Winnipeg Blue Bombers

Head coach
 Ron Lancaster, Hamilton Tiger-Cats

1998 CFL Awards
CFL's Most Outstanding Player Award – Mike Pringle (RB), Montreal Alouettes
CFL's Most Outstanding Canadian Award – Mike Morreale (SB), Hamilton Tiger-Cats
CFL's Most Outstanding Defensive Player Award – Joe Montford (DE), Hamilton Tiger-Cats
CFL's Most Outstanding Offensive Lineman Award – Fred Childress (OG), Calgary Stampeders
CFL's Most Outstanding Rookie Award – Steve Muhammad (DB), BC Lions
CFLPA's Outstanding Community Service Award – Glen Scrivener (DT), Winnipeg Blue Bombers
CFL's Coach of the Year – Ron Lancaster, Hamilton Tiger-Cats
Commissioner's Award - Jim Hunt, Toronto Writer, Radio Broadcaster

References

1998
1998 in Canadian football